Sanex is a brand of personal care products owned by Colgate-Palmolive. It is sold in European countries (including United Kingdom, Netherlands, Belgium, France, Spain, Portugal, Denmark, Greece, Poland, Norway and Croatia) and South Africa. 
In 2011, the brand was acquired from Unilever for £580 million.

Products 
Product lines include deodorant, shower gel, liquid hand soap and body, face and hand moisturisers.

See also 
 Colgate-Palmolive

References

External links 
 

British brands
Colgate-Palmolive brands
Former Unilever brands
Personal care brands